Millican is Reckless Kelly's first studio album. The album gets its title from the town of Millican, Oregon. It was the band's first and only album released on the Cold Spring label.

Track listing

Standard Tracks
"Walton Love" – 3:19
"Back Around" – 2:48
"It's All Over" – 2:59
"I Still Do" – 3:02
"Black & White" – 3:07
"Waitin' On The Blues" – 3:34
"Hatax" – 4:03
"Hey Say May" – 3:31
"Drink Your Whiskey Down" – 3:12
"Baby's Gone Blues" – 3:52
"Time Bomb" – 3:27

20th Anniversary Edition

Side A
"Back Around"
"Walton Love"
"It's All Over"
"I Still Do"

Side B
"Black & White"
"Waitin' On The Blues"
"Hatax"
"Hey Say May"

Side C
"Drink Your Whiskey Down"
"Baby's Gone Blues"
"Time Bomb"

Side D
"Wild Western Windblown Band"
"Millican"

References 

Reckless Kelly (band) albums
1998 albums
Cold Spring (label) albums